Ryan John Vargas (born September 23, 2000) is an American professional stock car racing driver. He competes part-time in the NASCAR Craftsman Truck Series, driving the No. 30 Toyota Tundra for On Point Motorsports and part-time in the NASCAR Xfinity Series, driving the No. 74 Chevrolet Camaro for CHK Racing.

Racing career

Early career

2012–2014
Vargas started racing in 2012, running Bandolero cars at Irwindale Speedway.

2015
He later moved up to Super Stock and super late model racing in 2015.

2019
After competing full-time in the NASCAR K&N Pro Series East in 2018, Vargas returned to Irwindale Speedway for a full season of Super Late Model racing in 2019 for friend Aalec Martinez out West while also running Late Model Stock Car races in the East for Lee Faulk Racing.

K&N Pro Series East

2018

In 2018, Vargas signed with Rev Racing for a full season in the NASCAR K&N Pro Series East. After starting the season with finishes outside of the top ten, he finished ninth at Langley. The following round at South Boston Speedway, he crashed out after being collected in a wreck with Anthony Alfredo and Dillon Bassett on lap 22. Vargas ended the season sixth in points with six top tens. He did not return to Rev Racing in 2019.

Xfinity Series

2019

In July 2019, Vargas made his debut in the NASCAR Xfinity Series at Iowa Speedway for JD Motorsports.

2020

He returned to the series and JD Motorsports in June 2020 on a multi-race deal. Six more races were added to Vargas' schedule in September when he picked up a six-race sponsorship from the popular social networking service TikTok.

2021

In 2021, Vargas moved to a full-time schedule with JDM in the No. 6. Ahead of the Dover race in May, Vargas switched cars with JDM teammate Landon Cassill and moved to the No. 4; the swap was spurred as the No. 6 was 37th in owner points, which would have placed it too low to qualify for later races. He was replaced by Spencer Pumpelly for the following week's race at Circuit of the Americas, but returned the following week.

Personal life
Vargas was born with craniosynostosis. He attended La Mirada High School.

Motorsports career results

NASCAR
(key) (Bold – Pole position awarded by qualifying time. Italics – Pole position earned by points standings or practice time. * – Most laps led.)

Xfinity Series

Craftsman Truck Series

 Season still in progress
 Ineligible for series points

K&N Pro Series East

References

External links

 
 

Living people
2000 births
Racing drivers from California
People from La Mirada, California
NASCAR drivers